Jake Connor (born 18 October 1994) is an English professional rugby league footballer who plays as a  or  for the Huddersfield Giants in the Betfred Super League, and  and  at international level. 

He has previously played for Huddersfield after coming through the Academy system at the  Giants, spending time on loan at Batley in the Championship and Oldham (Heritage № 1348) in League 1. He signed for Hull F.C. in 2017 and returned to Huddersfield for the 2023 season.

Background
Connor was born in Halifax, West Yorkshire, England. His paternal grandfather is from Trinidad.

Career

Huddersfield
Connor is a graduate of Huddersfield's academy system and made his Super League début for the Giants on 7 September 2013 in a match against local rivals Bradford Bulls.

Connor played just one match on dual registration with Championship club Batley Bulldogs in the club's 2014 defeat away at Leigh Centurions.

Connor was dual registered with Oldham and played twice for the club, his début being the club's 2015 home encounter with York City Knights at Whitebank Stadium.

Hull F.C.
Connor signed for Hull F.C. for the 2017 season.

He played in the 2017 Challenge Cup Final victory over Wigan at Wembley Stadium.

Connor played 16 games for Hull F.C. in the 2020 Super League season including the club's semi-final defeat against Wigan.

Connor played 18 games for Hull F.C. in the 2021 Super League season where they missed the playoffs finishing 8th on the table.
In round 1 of the 2022 Super League season, Connor was sent off in Hull FC's victory over Wakefield Trinity.

It was announced that Jake was returning to Huddersfield in October 2022.

International career
Connor made his England debut against  at Mile High Stadium in Denver in 2018 and scored on his debut.

He was selected in England 9s squad for the 2019 Rugby League World Cup 9s.

He was selected in the squad for the 2019 Great Britain Lions tour of the Southern Hemisphere.

On 25 June 2021 he played for the Combined Nations All Stars in their 26-24 victory over England, staged at the Halliwell Jones Stadium, Warrington, as part of England’s 2021 Rugby League World Cup preparation.

References

External links
Hull F.C. profile
SL profile

1994 births
Living people
Batley Bulldogs players
Combined Nationalities rugby league team players
England national rugby league team players
English people of Trinidad and Tobago descent
English rugby league players
Great Britain national rugby league team players
Huddersfield Giants players
Hull F.C. players
Oldham R.L.F.C. players
Rugby league centres
Rugby league five-eighths
Rugby league fullbacks
Rugby league players from Halifax, West Yorkshire